Eduardo Teixeira da Fonseca Vasconcellos, known as Eduardo "Edu" Falaschi (born May 18, 1972), is a Brazilian musician. He is best known as the former lead singer and songwriter of São Paulo-based heavy metal band Angra. With Angra, Falaschi recorded four albums (Rebirth, Temple of Shadows, Aurora Consurgens, and Aqua). 

He is also noted for his solo band Almah, which started as a side project featuring a number of guest musicians and is now his main and only band.

Early life and first musical experiences 
When he was one year old, Falaschi's parents moved to Rio de Janeiro, where he lived until the age of 12. His mother decided to move back to São Paulo, and then São Vicente, influenced by factors including the death of Falaschi's father.

Falaschi's first experience with music began as a child. Some of his relatives were non-professional musicians, and he used to sing with his father and uncles during family meetings. By the time he was 14 years old, he was taking guitar lessons, and his interest in music increased. Although he was strongly influenced by the singers Ronnie James Dio and Bruce Dickinson, Falaschi decided to play instrumental songs instead.

He played the drums for six months in a blues band with his friends, and he also played bass and guitar and sang backing vocals in a cover band. In 1989, he was invited by school friends to join a band as a singer to play at a music contest. They recorded a demo tape and played for 5,000 people. Subsequently, in 1990, some of the band members decided to form Mitrium, a rock band, in which they played their own compositions.

Career with Mitrium 
Mitrium began Falaschi's professional career as vocalist and composer. In 1991, they recorded their first demo tape with the song "Just Remember". Afterwards, they recorded the second demo with the songs "The Shadows" and "You Can Choose The Side of Darkness", both written by Falaschi.

The band grew quickly in São Vicente, so they decided to look for opportunities in São Paulo, where they signed a record deal with a record company which released a split-LP called Eyes of Time with four tracks: "Eyes of Time", "Run From the Fire", "Lives So Close" and "The Shadows", all of them written by Falaschi.

In 1994, the heavy metal band Iron Maiden was looking for a new singer through an international contest sponsored by the band, resulting in thousands of tapes being sent in by would-be rock stars. With the increasing recognition of Mitrium, Falaschi had the chance of taking part in the contest. Unexpectedly, he was one of the selected singers from Brazil (along with Andre Matos, then vocalist of Angra) and later from all around the world, getting in contact with Dick Bell, production director of Iron Maiden Holding LTD. In the end, the band did not pick Falaschi.

In spite of the professional career success, on August 5, 1994 Falaschi was forced to leave Mitrium due to personal problems, but he kept playing just for fun with his friends, and later recorded a demo, with eight simple rock n' roll songs with a band called Opium.

Career with Symbols, Angra and Almah 
Falaschi decided to take a break for almost four years. In the middle of 1998, he was invited by the band Symbols to produce their first album. The leader of the band was Tito Falaschi, his brother. Falaschi ended up producing the album and also being a member of the band. While their first album self-titled Symbols was being released, he was invited to perform in the album Ordinary Existence by Venus. In 2000, Symbols released their second album, called Call to the End.

The Brazilian band Angra was looking for new members, and after a trial among other vocalists, Falaschi was invited to join the band in 2000. As in 2012, Falaschi left Angra due to health issues and problems within the band.

In 2006, under the project name Almah, he released his first solo album, self-titled. In 2008, as a full band, Almah released their second album, Fragile Equality.

Health-voice problems and treatment
Falaschi performed poorly at Rock in Rio 2011, after which he started his treatment. He talked about this problems in an interview for a Russian website in 2012:

Discography

Mitrium
 Eyes of Time (1993)

Symbols
 Symbols (1998)
 Call to the End (2000)

Venus
 Ordinary Existence (1998)

Angra
 Rebirth (2001)
 "Acid Rain" (2001) – single
 "Hunters and Prey" (2002) – EP
 "Rebirth World Tour – Live in São Paulo" (2001) – live album
 Temple of Shadows (2004)
 "Wishing Well" (2004) – single
 Aurora Consurgens (2006)
 Aqua (2010)
 "Arising Thunder" (2010) – single

Almah
 Almah (2006)
 Fragile Equality (2008)
 Motion (2011)
 Unfold (2013)
 E.V.O (2016)

Solo
 Moonlight (2016)
 Ballads (2017)
 The Glory of Sacred Truth (2018) – EP
 Temple of Shadows in Concert (2020)
 Vera Cruz (2021)
 Eldorado (2023)

Special music in Anime – Brazilian Portuguese versions for Japanese Anime songs
 Pegasus Fantasy (Saint Seiya Sanctuary and Hades Chapter)
 Blue Forever (Saint Seiya Sanctuary and Hades Chapter)
 Never (Saint Seiya Heaven Chapter: Overture)

Guest appearances
 Genius Rock Opera Episode 2: In Search of the Little Prince (2002)
 Stilverlight (Russian band) Stilverlight (2014)
 Marius Danielsen The Legend of Valley Doom Part 1 (2015)
 Stardust Reverie Project Proclamation of Shadows (2015)

References

External links
 

1972 births
Angra (band) members
Brazilian heavy metal singers
Living people
Singers from São Paulo
Brazilian people of Italian descent
Brazilian heavy metal guitarists
Brazilian male guitarists
English-language singers from Brazil
21st-century Brazilian male singers
21st-century Brazilian singers
21st-century guitarists
Almah (band) members